Stefanie Vögele won the title, defeating Sara Sorribes Tormo in the final in straight sets: 6–4, 6–2. Johanna Larsson was the defending champion, but chose not to participate.

Seeds

Draw

Finals

Top half

Bottom half

References
Main Draw

Grand Est Open 88 - Singles